The SNCASO SO.1310 Farfadet was an experimental French convertiplane of the 1950s.

Design and development
The SO.1310 was a compound gyroplane featuring a tip-jet driven, three-bladed rotor, a fixed wing and a turboprop engine driving a nose-mounted propeller. First flown on 8 May 1953 the aircraft achieved transition to forward flight on 1 July of that year.

Specifications (SO.1310)

See also

References
Notes

Bibliography

 Taylor, John W.R. Jane's Pocket Book of Research and Experimental Aircraft, London, Macdonald and Jane's Publishers Ltd, 1976. .

External links

Flight, 12 March 1954
"French Air Oddities" Popular Mechanics, December 1953, p. 115.

1950s French experimental aircraft
Gyrodynes
Farfadet
Aircraft first flown in 1953